Sukli  is the eighth studio album by Filipino rapper Gloc-9. It was released on June 5, 2016, under Star Music.

"Hoy" was released last May 2016 on MYX and it peaked #5 on Pinoy MYX Countdown & #6 on MYX Daily Top 10.

"Sagwan" was released last December 14, 2016 on MYX. It peaked #10 on Pinoy MYX Countdown (as of December 25, 2016) & #9 on MYX Daily Top 10: Pinoy Edition (as of December 2016).

Track listing

References

Gloc-9 albums
2016 albums
Star Music albums